.in is the Internet country code top-level domain (ccTLD) for India. It was made available in 1989, four years after original generic top-level domains such as .com, .net and the country code like .us. It is currently administered by the National Internet Exchange of India (NIXI).

Registry operator
The domain was originally managed by the National Centre for Software Technology (NCST) and its Centre for Development of Advanced Computing (C-DAC). The Government of India issued an executive order in 2004 to transfer responsibility for managing .in domains to the newly created INRegistry under the authority of the National Internet Exchange of India (NIXI). The National Informatics Centre (NIC), ERNET, and the Ministry of Defence were appointed as registrars for the gov.in, res.in and ac.in, and the mil.in domains respectively.

In August 2018, NIXI appointed Neustar Data Infotech (India), a subsidiary of Neustar Inc, to be the country's new registry services provider. Neustar completed migration of existing .in domains to its registry infrastructure in March 2019. Neustar added the ability to register Indian-language domains in native script by enabling end-to-end web portal language support.

Second-level domains 
, liberalised policies for the  domain allow unlimited second-level registrations under . Unlimited registrations under the previously structured existing zones are also allowed:

  (available to anyone; used by companies, individuals, and organisations in India)
  (intended for banks, registered companies, and trademarks)
  (available to anyone; used by companies, individuals, and organisations in India)
  (intended for shops, partnerships, liaison offices, sole proprietorships)
  (intended for Internet service providers)
  (intended for nonprofit organisations)
  (intended for general/miscellaneous use)
  (intended for individuals)

Zones reserved for use by qualified institutions in India:
  (Older, for both educational and research institutes)
  (Academic institutions)
  (Educational institutions)
  (Indian research institutes)
  (Indian government)
  (Indian military organisations)

The .in registry launched following sub-domains on Oct 29, 2021 to benefit the growing market:
 
 
 
 
 
 
 
 
 
 
 
 
 
 
 
 
 
 
 
 
 
 
 
 
 
 
 
 
 

Before the introduction of liberalised registration policies for the  domain, only 7000 names had been registered between 1992 and 2004. , the number had increased to over 610,000 domain names with 60% of registrations coming from India and the rest from overseas. By October 2011, the number had surpassed 1 million domain names. , the number has more than doubled to over 2 million domain names.

Restrictions on use of .in domains 
As per the terms and conditions of the  registry, domain privacy is not allowed.

Recently updated EKYC guidelines were issued to all registrars to authenticate new registrants. Hence, the previous rule relating to bulk booking of .in domain names has been withdrawn. Now customers can book unlimited .in domain names as previously in line with promoting .in TLD on par with other popular TLDs like .com and others which also has no restrictions relating to bulk booking.

Internationalised domain names and country codes 
India plans to introduce internationalised domain names in the 22 local languages used in India. , fifteen of these internationalised domain names were accepted by ICANN:

  (Devanagari), became available with the following zones:
{|
| align="center" style="background:#f0f0f0;"|Devanagari string
| align="center" style="background:#f0f0f0;"|Transliterated string
|-
| भारत||.bharat
|-
| कंपनी.भारत||company.bharat
|-
| विद्या.भारत||vidya.bharat
|-
| सरकार.भारत||sarkar.bharat
|-
| 
|
|}
  (Bengali), available 
  (Gurmukhī), only ਡਾਟਾਮੇਲ.ਭਾਰਤ 
  (Gujarati), available 
  (Tamil), available 
  (Telugu), available 
  (Urdu) only ڈاٹامیل.بھارت  (mainly right-to-left character order)

In 2016, an application for eight further domains was accepted. While Indian government also applied for .বাংলা (Bengali) it was given to compa etitive applicant, the Bangladesh Telecommunication Company Limited (BTCL). They were not available: But, they were later on made available and now are open for domain registration in India.
  (Kannada)
  (Assamese)
  (Kashmiri)
  (Malayalam)
  (Odia)
  (Sanskrit)
  (Santali)
  (Sindhi)

See also 
 Country code top-level domain
 Internet in India

References

External links and references 
 IANA Whois information
 whois information
 Policies from the INRegistry website
 List of Accredited registrars for .in

Computer-related introductions in 1989
Country code top-level domains
Internet in India
1989 establishments in India

he:סיומת אינטרנט#טבלת סיומות המדינות
sv:Toppdomän#I